Janz is an Australian band formed by David Janz and Robert Parde who recruited Phil Martin, Miles Stewart Howie and David Carr to complete the band. The band won the 1988 Yamaha International Rock Music Competition in Japan. Their debut single "Crime" reached #40 on Australian singles chart.

Janz (also spelt Jaanz) went on to run the David Jaanz School of Singing. Parde continued as a songwriter and amongst others co wrote Vanessa Amorosi's "Shine" and Tina Arena's "Wasn't It Good".

Phil Martin has continued to write music and currently has a successful solo project   “ Phil Martin’s Drive” . Phil has been working with former Janz band member, David Carr in David’s studio, Rangemaster. Together they have coproduced many of Phil’s songs. 
Phil is currently signed to record label “ Melodic records”.

Members
David Janz (vocals)
Robert Parde (keyboards, vocals)
Phil Martin (bass, vocals)
Miles Stewart Howie (drums, percussion)
David Carr (guitar)
Debbie Lavell (backing vocals)
Vinnie Demore (guitar)

Discography
"Crime" (1989) - CBS Aus #40
"Picture" (1989) - CBS

References 

Australian musical groups
Living people
Year of birth missing (living people)